Bellary Lok Sabha constituency is one of the 28 Lok Sabha (constituencies) in Karnataka state in southern India. This constituency is reserved for the candidates belonging to the Scheduled tribes after the delimitation exercise in 2008

Assembly segments

Presently, Bellary Lok Sabha constituency comprises the following eight Legislative Assembly segments

Members of Parliament

Election results

Lok Sabha election 2019

By election 2018

Lok Sabha election 2014

By election 2000

Lok Sabha election 1999

See also
 Bellary district
 List of Constituencies of the Lok Sabha

References

Lok Sabha constituencies in Karnataka
Bellary district